The Mazon Creek fossil beds are a conservation  found near Morris, in Grundy County, Illinois. These concretions frequently preserve both hard and soft tissues of animal and plant materials, as well as many soft-bodied organisms that do not normally fossilize. The quality, quantity and diversity of fossils in the area, known since the mid-nineteenth century, make the Mazon Creek  important to paleontologists, in attempting to reconstruct the paleoecology of the sites. The locality was declared a National Historic Landmark in 1997.

Geology
The Mazon Creek fossils are found in the Upper Carboniferous Francis Creek Shale; the type locality is the Mazon River (or Mazon Creek), a tributary of the Illinois River near Morris, Grundy County, Illinois. The fossiliferous concretions are usually found within the thickest deposits of Francis Creek. The concretions occur in localized deposits within the silty to sandy mudstones, in the lower four metres of the formation. The paleoecosystem is believed to be a large river delta system, deposited by at least one major river system flowing from the northeast. The sediments are believed to derive from the Appalachian orogeny events. The delta had a tropical climate, a result of the area being within 10° north latitude of the equator during the Pennsylvanian.

The remains of plants and animals were rapidly buried by the sediment deposited in the deltaic system. Bacterial decomposition of the remains produced carbon dioxide that combined with dissolved iron from the groundwater. This process formed siderite in the sediments surrounding the remains, forming detailed casts of their structure. Lithification of the sediments formed protective nodules of ironstone around the now fossilized remains.  This mode of preservation is known as authigenic mineralisation.

Location

The fossiliferous concretions are found in the Mazon River area of Grundy, Will, Kankakee, and Livingston counties. Additional fossils are found in LaSalle County, Illinois; between the Vermilion River and Marseilles, Illinois. The ironstone concretions are recovered from exposures along streams, roadcuts and in active or abandoned coal mine areas.

The common local pronunciation of the fossil site is Muh-ZOHN, although the scientific community, including paleontologists and geologists, pronounce the name of the fossil beds as MAY-zon. 

Most concretions are found among the shale and sandstone that was piled up in either a spoil tip of an older underground mine, or ridges of the later surface mining. The Peabody Energy company operated several large strip mines in Grundy County that are now abandoned. They were named Pit 1 through Pit 11. The northern pits 1-8 are known for the Braidwood Biota with mostly terrestrial fauna and flora. Pit 11, which was located southwest of the town of Braidwood, Illinois, is known for its Essex Biota with a greater abundance of marine species. Pit 11 is now Braidwood State Fish and Wildlife Area, an Illinois state park. Fossil collecting is allowed at the park with a permit.

The site's importance was realized in the mid-nineteenth century: "the nodules of Mazon Creek, where fragments of plants, even of the softest texture, have been preserved in  their integrity".

Flora
The Mazon Creek flora comprises over 400 species from at least 130 genera. However, the true number of species is difficult to determine. Paleobotanists name separate plant structures with different names by convention, inflating the number of fossil plant taxa. Paleobotanists are currently determining which taxa are valid.

Mazon Creek flora includes: lycopsids, related to modern club moss, with arborescent forms named Lepidophloios, Sigillaria and Lepidodendron, and herbaceous forms called Lycopodites and Cormophyton; sphenopsids like Calamites a tree-like horsetail relative, with common foliage names of Annularia and Asterophyllites, and a vine-like form called Sphenophyllum; Pteridophyta as marattitalean tree ferns and Filicales and Zygopteridales understory ferns, with common foliage names of Pecopteris, Acitheca and Lobatopteris; pteridosperms, also known as seed ferns, an extinct group of plants that grew both as trees and smaller shrubs, with features like pinnated leaves similar to true ferns, but reproduced by seeds instead of spores; they had common foliage names Mariopteris, Alethopteris, Odontopteris, Neuropteris, Laveineopteris and Macroneuropteris; extinct gymnosperm Cordaites, believed to be closely related to and sharing many features with modern conifers.

Fauna

The Mazon Creek fauna has over 320 species of animals that have been identified. The fauna is divided into two components: the  marine Essex fauna and the land and freshwater Braidwood fauna, that were washed into the deltaic sediments.

Essex biota
The Essex fauna includes jellyfish, sea worms, snails, saltwater clams, shrimp, sea scorpions, cephalopods and fish.
The most common species found is the Essexella jellyfish. It consists of 42% of all fossil finds in the Essex biota. The Essex area also includes the most famous faunal member of the Illinois state fossil Tullimonstrum, known popularly as the "Tully Monster". Other well-documented organisms include the crustacean Belotelson and the possible hemichordate Etacystis.

Braidwood biota
The Braidwood fauna includes insects, millipedes, centipedes, scorpions, spiders, other arachnids, amphibians, freshwater fish, freshwater shrimps, freshwater horseshoe crabs and ostracods. The oldest known beetle has been described from the Braidwood fauna.

Three species of centipede have been described from Mazon Creek. They are known from around 60 specimens in total, and belong to three species:
Latzelia primordialis Scudder, 1890 (Scutigeromorpha)
Mazoscolopendra richardsoni Mundel, 1979 (Scolopendromorpha)
Palenarthrus impressus Scudder, 1890 (Scolopendromorpha)
Fossil centipedes are very rare; these species are the only known Paleozoic scolopendromorphs.

See also

 Burgess Shale
 Hamilton Quarry
 Mazonova

References

Further reading

External links

 Illinois State Museum: Mazon Creek Fossil Exhibit 
 UC Berkeley: Mazon Creek fossil beds info
Northeastern Illinois University: fossil fauna
 Fossil News.com: General diagram of Mazon Creek Delta — with photographs of fossils.
 University of Bristol.uk: Mazon Creek flora and fauna — species discussed, with photographs of fossils.
 Flickr.com: Mazon Creek Lagerstätte photo gallery

Carboniferous paleontological sites
Lagerstätten
Paleozoic paleontological sites of North America
Geography of Grundy County, Illinois
Carboniferous Illinois
Natural history of Illinois
Paleontology in Illinois
National Historic Landmarks in Illinois
Natural features on the National Register of Historic Places
National Register of Historic Places in Grundy County, Illinois
Protected areas of Grundy County, Illinois
1997 in paleontology